Public Law 280 (August 15, 1953, codified as , , and ), is a federal law of the United States establishing "a method whereby States may assume jurisdiction over reservation Indians," as stated in McClanahan v. Arizona State Tax Commission. 411 U.S. 164, 177 (1973).

The Act mandated a transfer of federal law enforcement authority within certain tribal nations to state governments in six states: California, Minnesota (except the Red Lake Nation and Mille Lacs Band of Ojibwe), Nebraska, Oregon (except the Warm Springs Reservation),  Wisconsin (except later the Menominee Indian Reservation) and, upon its statehood, Alaska. Other states were allowed to elect similar transfers of power if the Indian tribes affected give their consent. Since then, Arizona, Florida, Idaho, Iowa, Montana, Nevada, North Dakota, South Dakota, Utah, and Washington have assumed some jurisdiction over crimes committed by tribal members on tribal lands.

The Act added to a complex matrix of jurisdictional conflict that defined tribal governance at the end of the 20th century. In various states, local police, tribal police, BIA police, and the FBI are the arms of a law enforcement system that enforces laws of tribes, states and the federal government. The Act also added that tribe cannot put non-natives on trial, even when crime occurs on reservation land. 

Under the Act, states, local sheriffs and state law enforcement agencies take tribal members to state courts for prosecution in cases arising from criminal matters within reservation boundaries. But most tribal governments and pueblos have also adopted their own codes, and administer court systems to adjudicate violations of the code.

In states where the Act has not been applied, Bureau of Indian Affairs (BIA) police respond to major crimes on reservations or pueblos. The FBI joins in investigations of the most serious criminal matters such as murders or kidnappings. In those states, when allegations against tribal members arise from crimes on a reservation, the United States Attorney cites violations of the United States Code in a United States district court. Tribal and pueblo police also enforce local codes in "non-PL 280" states.

Notes

Reference list

See also

Tribal sovereignty in the United States
Indian Reorganization Act
Indian termination policy

External links 
Tribal Court Clearinghouse: Public Law 280
Text of the statute
 Public Law 280 and Law Enforcement in Indian Country – Research Priorities, NCJ 209839, National Institute of Justice. (2005). U.S. Department of Justice

1953 in law
United States federal Native American legislation
83rd United States Congress
United States federal legislation articles without infoboxes